No Love Lost may refer to:

Literature
 No Love Lost (book), a 2003 collection of short stories by Alice Munro
 No Love Lost, a 1997 graphic novel by Ariel Bordeaux
 No Love Lost, a 2001 novel by Eileen Dewhurst
 "No Love Lost", an 1868 poem by William Dean Howells

Music
 No Love Lost, a group on The X Factor: Celebrity, 2019

Albums
 No Love Lost (Joe Budden album) or the title song, 2013
 No Love Lost (The Nightingales album), 2012
 No Love Lost (The Rifles album), 2006
 No Love Lost, by Kate Schutt, 2007
 No Love Lost, by Omega Tribe, 1983
 No Love Lost, an EP by Blxst, or the title song, 2020

Songs
 "No Love Lost", by Carcass from Heartwork, 1993
 "No Love Lost", by Corey Hart from Young Man Running, 1988
 "No Love Lost", by IQ from Nomzamo, 1987
 "No Love Lost", by Joy Division from An Ideal for Living, 1978
 "No Love Lost", by KeySi, competing to represent Belarus in the Eurovision Song Contest 2019
 "No Love Lost", by Polyrock from Polyrock, 1980
 "No Love Lost", by Shaquille O'Neal from You Can't Stop the Reign, 1996
 "No Love Lost", by the Statler Brothers from Atlanta Blue, 1984
 "No Love Lost", by Yngwie Malmsteen from Magnum Opus, 1995

See also
 "Ain't No Love Lost", a 2006 song by Hadise
 "Ain't No Love Lost", a song by Curtis Mayfield from Got to Find a Way, 1974